Teriomima is a genus of butterflies in the family Lycaenidae. Teriomima is endemic to the Afrotropics.

Species
Subgenus Teriomima
Teriomima puella Kirby, 1887
Teriomima puellaris Trimen, 1894
Teriomima subpunctata Kirby, 1887
Teriomima williami Henning & Henning, 2004
Teriomima zuluana van Son, 1949
Subgenus Chrystina Henning & Henning, 2004
Teriomima micra (Grose-Smith, 1898)
Teriomima parva Hawker-Smith, 1933

External links
Teriomima at funet

Poritiinae
Lycaenidae genera
Taxa named by William Forsell Kirby